Marika Aba (November 12, 1929, Budapest, Hungary — November 12, 1972) was an American dancer and journalist. 

Born Marika Wolff, her father was an engineer who disappeared while working in Turkey at the outbreak of World War II. After the war, during the Soviet occupation of Hungary, she and her mother, Georgina Maros, escaped to Austria by swimming across a river at night. Having trained as a ballerina in Austria, she was a prima ballerina in Rome when she landed the role of the "Assyrian Dancer at Nero's banquet" in the 1951 movie Quo Vadis. After this role, she and her mother moved to Sherman Oaks, California. 

In 1952, she appeared as the flower girl in the MGM musical film Lovely to Look At. In 1961, she appeared as a contestant on the TV quiz show, You Bet Your Life, hosted by Groucho Marx. She was escorted on stage by Harpo Marx.

After her brief film career she became a journalist, writing for the Los Angeles Times about the arts. She returned to Italy and focused her reporting on the Italian movie industry. Film critic Charles Champlin noted the "ebullience and wit" of her writing.

Death
At the time of her death, Aba was publicity director for Verona Film, and production and publicity liaison for Paramount Pictures and Cinema International Corporation. She died in Paris, France on her 43rd birthday following what was described as "a long illness". Her funeral and burial were in Rome.

Family
Aba was the second wife of Norman Nathan Semler. The couple had one child, a son named Gary. Aba was survived by her mother and her son, both in California.

Filmography

References

1929 births
1972 deaths
Journalists from California
Hungarian emigrants to the United States
20th-century American dancers
Los Angeles Times people
Hungarian expatriates in Austria
Hungarian expatriates in Italy
20th-century American journalists
Burials in Italy
American expatriates in Austria
American expatriates in Italy